In mathematical analysis, in particular the subfields of convex analysis and optimization, a proper convex function is an extended real-valued convex function with a non-empty domain, that never takes on the value  and also is not identically equal to  

If the function takes  as a value then  is necessarily the global minimum value and the minimization problem can be answered; this is ultimately the reason why the definition of "" requires that the function never take  as a value. Assuming this, if the function's domain is empty or if the function is identically equal to  then the minimization problem once again has an immediate answer. Extended real-valued function for which the minimization problem is not solved by any one of these three trivial cases are exactly those that are called . Many (although not all) results whose hypotheses require that the function be proper add this requirement specifically to exclude these trivial cases. 

If the problem is instead a maximization problem (which would be clearly indicated, such as by the function being concave rather than convex) then the definition of "" is defined in an analogous (albeit technically different) manner but with the same goal: to exclude cases where the maximization problem can be answered immediately. Specifically, a concave function  is called  if its negation  which is a convex function, is proper in the sense defined above.

Definitions

Suppose that  is a function taking values in the extended real number line  

  for   

and if there also exists  point  in its domain such that

That is, a function is  if its effective domain is nonempty and it never attains the value . 

A  is by definition, any function  such that  is a proper convex function.

Properties

for every  

The sum of two proper convex functions is convex, but not necessarily proper.

The infimal convolution of two proper convex functions is convex but not necessarily proper convex.

See also

Citations

References

  

Convex analysis
Types of functions